Brian Wilson (born 1942) is an American musician and co-founder of The Beach Boys.

Brian Wilson may also refer to:

People

Sportspeople
Brian Wilson (baseball) (born 1982), Major League Baseball pitcher 
Brian Wilson (Australian rules footballer) (born 1961), Brownlow Medal winner 1982
Brian Wilson (footballer, born 1925) (1925–1984), Australian rules footballer for Geelong
Brian Wilson (footballer, born 1957), English footballer (Newcastle United FC)
Brian Wilson (footballer, born 1983), English footballer currently playing for Barrow A.F.C.
Brian Wilson (poker player) (born 1967), bracelet winner at the 2005 World Series of Poker
Brian Wilson (tennis) (born 1982), American tennis player

Other people
Brian Anthony Wilson (born 1960), American film and television actor
Brian Courtney Wilson, American gospel and CCM singer
Brian Graham Wilson (born 1930), Australian astrophysicist and academic
Brian Wilson (news correspondent) (born 1956), Washington D.C. bureau chief and vice president of Fox News Channel
Brian Wilson (Labour politician) (born 1948), British Labour Party politician and MP
Brian Wilson (Northern Ireland politician) (born 1943), Green Party politician in Northern Ireland
Brian Wilson (systems scientist) (born 1933), British academic,  co-developer of soft systems methodology (SSM)

Music
Brian Wilson (album), the debut solo album by the American musician
"Brian Wilson" (song), a 1992 song referring to the musician, by Canadian rock band Barenaked Ladies

See also
Bryan Wilson (disambiguation)
Bryon Wilson (born 1988), American skier
Byron Wilson (basketball) (born 1971), American basketball player
Brian Willson (born 1941), peace activist, founding member of Veterans for Peace

Wilson, Brian